Wildcat Mountain is the name of 43 summits in the United States, including:

One of 43 mountain summits in the United States:
Wildcat Mountain (Alabama)
Wildcat Mountain (Conway County, Arkansas)
Wildcat Mountain (Saline County, Arkansas)
Wildcat Mountain (Sebastian County, Arkansas)
Wildcat Mountain (Fresno County, California)
Wildcat Mountain (Mariposa County, California)-1
Wildcat Mountain (Mariposa County, California)-2
Wildcat Mountain (Sonoma County, California)
Wildcat Mountain (Douglas County, Colorado)
Wildcat Mountain (Pitkin County, Colorado)
Wildcat Mountain (Connecticut)
Wildcat Mountain (Georgia)
Wildcat Mountain (Laurel County, Kentucky)
Wildcat Mountain (Powell County, Kentucky)
Wildcat Mountain (Massachusetts)
Wildcat Mountain (Missouri) - in Iron County, Missouri
Wildcat Mountain (Shannon County, Missouri)
Wildcat Mountain (Flathead County, Montana)
Wildcat Mountain (Stillwater County, Montana)
Wildcat Mountain (Buncombe County, North Carolina)
Wildcat Mountain (Cherokee County, North Carolina)
Wildcat Mountain (Davidson County, North Carolina)
Wildcat Mountain (Nebraska)
Wildcat Mountain (New Hampshire)
Wildcat Mountain (Orange County, New York)
Wildcat Mountain (Ulster County, New York)
Wildcat Mountain (Oklahoma)
Wildcat Mountain (Clackamas County, Oregon)
Wildcat Mountain (Crook County, Oregon)
Wildcat Mountain (Linn County, Oregon)
Wildcat Mountain (Washington County, Oregon)
Wildcat Mountain (Pennsylvania)
Wildcat Mountain (Burnet County, Texas)
Wildcat Mountain (Coke County, Texas)
Wildcat Mountain (Edwards County, Texas)
Wildcat Mountain (Nolan County, Texas)
Wildcat Mountain (Utah)
Wildcat Mountain (Botetourt County, Virginia)-1
Wildcat Mountain (Botetourt County, Virginia)-2
Wildcat Mountain (Fauquier County, Virginia)
Wildcat Mountain (Clallam County, Washington)
Wildcat Mountain (Okanogan County, Washington)
Wildcat Mountain (Wisconsin)
Other:
Wildcat Mountain Ski Area in New Hampshire
Battle of Camp Wildcat (Battle of Wildcat Mountain), an American Civil War battle in Laurel County, Kentucky